The San Diego Freeway is one of the named principal Southern California freeways. It consists of the following two segments:

Interstate 5, from California State Route 94 in San Diego to Interstate 405 (El Toro Y) in Irvine 
Interstate 405, in its entirety from Interstate 5 in Irvine to Interstate 5 near San Fernando

References

Southern California freeways
Named freeways in California
Interstate 5
Interstate Highways in California
Roads in San Diego County, California
Roads in Orange County, California
Roads in Los Angeles County, California

es:San Diego Freeway